Adrienne Lili'i (born 9 November 1970) is a former New Zealand rugby union player. She debuted for the New Zealand women's national side, the Black Ferns, on 16 October 1999 against Canada at Palmerston North. She was selected for the 2002 Women's Rugby World Cup squad and started in four of their five games.

In 1999, Lili'i was part of an unofficial Samoan Manusina team that was invited to the Hong Kong 7s. She was in the Auckland team that won the  Women's NPC Championship in 2003.

Personal life 
Lili'i is of Samoan descent and was raised in South Auckland. She was born to Tuala Tele’a Lili'i, a social worker, and Margaret, a registered nurse. She played netball, tennis and badminton in her youth and spent two years of high school at St Mary's College in Vaimoso, Samoa.

She is married to Danny Leaoasavai'i, Dawn Raid Entertainment founder and former rapper Brotha D. They have two children.

References 

1970 births
Living people
New Zealand women's international rugby union players
New Zealand female rugby union players
People educated at Marcellin College, Auckland]